Norman Matt Glaser (August 31, 1894 – May 27, 1979) was a Major League Baseball pitcher who played in one game for the Detroit Tigers on September 21, .

External links

1894 births
1979 deaths
Detroit Tigers players
Major League Baseball pitchers
Baseball players from Cleveland
Nashville Vols players